Repentance is an act recognized in Judaism, Christianity, Islam, and other religions.

Repentance may also refer to:

 Repentance (Christianity), a specific aspect of salvation
 Repentance (Esham album), 2003
 Repentance (Lee "Scratch" Perry album), 2008
 Repentance (1922 film), a 1922 British silent drama film
 Repentance (1987 film), Georgian film directed by Tengiz Abuladze
 Repentance (2013 film), a 2013 psychological horror film
 "Repentance" (Star Trek: Voyager), the thirteenth episode broadcast of the seventh season of the TV series Star Trek: Voyager
 "Repentance" (story), an 1886 short story by Russian author Leo Tolstoy
 Repentance (song), a song by Dream Theater
 Repentance, an EP by Paramaecium